Grover Aloysius Whalen (1886–1962) was a prominent politician, businessman, and public relations guru in New York City during the 1930s and 1940s.

Early years
Whalen was born on July 2, 1886, in New York City, the son of an Irish immigrant father and a French-Canadian mother. They named their son after President Grover Cleveland, who was married on the same day that their child was born. His father, Michael Whalen, was a successful trucking contractor and a Tammany Hall supporter.

Grover Whalen attended DeWitt Clinton High School and afterwards studied law. He then joined the staff of John Wanamaker's department store, with which he would long be associated. He married Anna Dolores Kelly in 1913.

Whalen ran his father's ash and garbage disposal business for a time before becoming involved in politics, working for the election of John F. Hylan as Mayor of New York.

Political appointments
After Hylan became Mayor in 1918, Whalen was appointed to be Commissioner of Plants and Structures. In this position he supervised the city's transportation system. He also served as Hylan's Commissioner of Purchase and took part in greeting ceremonies, including the welcome of General John J. Pershing, commander of the American Expeditionary Forces, in 1919. In 1922, he proposed the creation of a radio station owned and operated by the city, a plan that came to fruition with the first broadcast of WNYC in 1924.

In 1924, Whalen left the Hylan administration to assist Rodman Wanamaker in the operation of the Wanamaker department stores, serving as general manager. Wanamaker named him Vice President of Operations for the American Trans-Oceanic Company, a new airline flying Curtiss seaplanes between New York and Florida.

Police Commissioner
In 1928, he returned to civic life when he was appointed by Mayor Jimmy Walker to the position of New York City Police Commissioner. He was known to be a ruthless enforcer of Prohibition laws. Whalen was famously quoted as saying, "There is plenty of law at the end of a nightstick."

Whalen came under fire for police handling of the International Unemployment Day demonstration on March 6, 1930, in New York City, in which an impromptu march of 35,000 or more demonstrators down Broadway to New York City Hall was set upon by 1,000 baton-wielding police.

The brutal scene was described by a reporter from the New York Times:

"Hundreds of policemen and detectives, swinging nightsticks, blackjacks, and bare fists, rushed into the crowd, hitting out at all with whom they came into contact, chasing many across the street and into adjacent thoroughfares and pushing hundreds off their feet. From all parts of the scene of battle came the screams of women and cries of men with bloody heads and faces."

Sharply criticized for the escalation of violence by the police, Whalen was forced to resign his post within two months.

Later career
He was later appointed by Fiorello La Guardia as Chairman of the Mayor's Committee on Receptions to Distinguished Guests, succeeding William Francis Deegan, and became a public celebrity easily recognized by his exquisitely groomed moustache and carnation boutonniere. In this capacity, in which he served until the early 1950s, he officially welcomed everyone from Charles Lindbergh to Admiral Richard Evelyn Byrd to Douglas MacArthur to New York and became master of the ticker tape parade.

In 1933, Whelan received The Hundred Year Association of New York's Gold Medal Award "in recognition of outstanding contributions to the City of New York." In 1935, he became president of the New York World Fair Corporation and put a familiar face on the 1939 New York World's Fair. He was on the cover of Time magazine on May 1, 1939.

Mr. New York
Whalen was known as the official greeter and organizer of many public events and celebrations taking place in New York during the first half of the 20th century. G.P. Putnam's Sons, the publisher of Whalen's autobiography, came up with Mr. New York as the title of his autobiography. The name naturally gave birth to a new nickname for Whalen, as his experiences working in the public and private sector gave him a representative personality of New York.

In the acknowledgements before beginning his autobiography, Whalen gives credit to the late Melville Minton, President of G.P. Putnam's Sons, for encouraging him to write a book about New York. During an interview with the New Yorker in November 1955, Whalen claims that Minton asked him to write a book about New York during the 1920s. The publishing company provided Whalen with a staff of researchers responsible for validating stories and facts incorporated into the autobiography. Ted Purdy, the man in charge of editing Whalen's writing, took the 800 pages penned by Whalen and condensed it into a 300-page collection of personal accounts. Purdy and his team also provided the Mr. New York title for the collection of stories written by Whalen.

The bulk of his writing describes planning and execution of receptions, ceremonies, and civic projects under his direction. He provides vivid imagery and background information regarding specific events such as ticker-tape parades for American heroes like Lindbergh after the completion of his flight across the Atlantic Ocean from New York to Paris in 1927. Whalen also goes into great detail about the planning and intricacies behind the parades for returning World War II soldiers, most notably General Dwight D. Eisenhower in June 1945. Although Whalen claims that he wrote extensively about those accounts because he thought his readers would find them most interesting, many accounts are a subtle way of documenting his accomplishments over the course of his career. Taking into account Minton's encouragement to write about the transformative societal change of New York during the first quarter of the twentieth century, had Minton been alive to read the published version of Whalen's autobiography, he might have been disappointed. For a man responsible for implementing much of New York City's policies working in the Mayor's office and later as NYPD police commissioner, Whalen offers a limited perspective into the implications of his professional career on the transformative social and cultural change happening within the city.

Furthermore, the autobiography ignores any corruption during his career in public service. Throughout his writings, he often refers to the advantages of political ambition under the wing of Tammany Hall. However, he never admits to any moral wrongdoing of the political machine. Also, after the stock market crashed in 1929, Frank Costello was recorded telling Lucky Luciano that he had to advance Whalen $30,000 to cover his margin calls on the market. A few seconds later he said, "What could I do? We own him." Although Whalen omits this in his autobiography, he was a somewhat corrupt public figure.

In the beginning and ending chapters of the autobiography, Whalen provides valuable insight on the many things he values and loves about his city. In the first few chapters, Whalen writes with a nostalgic pen recollecting memories of the family culture of the close-knit neighborhood he grew up in on the Lower East Side. Contrasted against his writing emphasizing efficiency and organization regarding later years, particularly when working for the Mayor's Office and as Police Commissioner, Whalen longs for his childhood days, when everyone in his neighborhood knew everyone by first name.

Also, in the last chapter he concludes by describing his fascination with New York, using the trajectory of his professional career as evidence of the proposed American dream: "New York means to me a place where anyone can still rise to the top, no matter how humble his beginnings." While it is true that Whalen was born to immigrant parents and eventually became a public figure, much of his success came from his connections with the Tammany Hall political machine. The accuracy behind his Mr. New York identity represents the promises of opportunity and success put forth in Whalen's autobiography but also the quietly corrupt culture neglected by Whalen in his autobiography.

Death and legacy
He died at the age of 75 on April 20, 1962.

He is mentioned in the Harold Arlen/Yip Harburg song Lydia the Tattooed Lady, the Cole Porter song Let's Fly Away, and the Bobby Short song Sweet Bye and Bye as well as in the 1933 film The Prizefighter and the Lady, starring Myrna Loy and Max Baer. Grover Whalen is also mentioned in Once in a Lifetime, a play written by Moss Hart and George S. Kaufman in 1930. He is also mentioned in E.B. White's essay "The World of Tomorrow." In P.G. Wodehouse's 1940 novel Quick Service, the character J.B. Duff's false moustache is compared disparagingly to that of Grover Whalen. A character in Gregory Mcdonald's Flynn novels (published between 1976 and 1999) is Sgt. Richard Whalen, who is consistently addressed by the mischievous Flynn as "Grover". Whalen has no idea why Flynn does this, and finds it annoying.

Whalen titled his 1955 autobiography Mr. New York.

Footnotes

1886 births
1962 deaths
Politicians from New York City
Chairpersons of the Mayor's Committee on Receptions to Distinguished Guests
Greeters
DeWitt Clinton High School alumni
New York City Police Commissioners